A belly fetish (also known as a stomach fetish, or alvinolagnia) is a partialism in which an individual is sexually attracted to the midriff or belly.

Belly fetish model Helena Strong stated, "People admire my belly. The only thing I expose is my belly. Most guys with belly fetishes get embarrassed if they see me fully naked."

Description 

The belly is widely considered as an erogenous region, meaning it holds multiple nerve endings that make it sensitive to various sensations. Therefore, having a belly fetish usually coincides with belly-related sexual acts including but not limited to touching/rubbing the belly region, using sex toys and other objects (e.g., food, candles, ice, feathers, massage oils) to stimulate the belly region, rubbing one's belly against a partner's belly, or licking or sucking the navel. For this reason, alvinolagnia often co-exists with navel fetishism (a.k.a., alvinophilia). Overall, the belly fetish is a form of partialism.

Belly-to-belly contact
Individuals with alvinolagnia tend to enjoy having sexual intercourse in the missionary position given the position's heightened belly-to-belly contact between partners. It is theorized that this sexual desire for belly-to-belly contact is linked to the evolutionary need for ventral-ventral contact when being nursed as an infant or to entice feelings of being nurtured and loved. One participant of a social experiment involving belly-to-belly contact described the act as "a very intimate thing, even when it's not meant to be."

The evolutionary need for ventral-ventral contact may also contribute to sexual arousal during objectively non-sexual belly-to-belly contact which may happen when hugging or cuddling while wearing skin-revealing clothing (e.g., crop top, bikini); taking part in some forms of partnered dance (e.g., bachata (dance)); or participating in sports involving belly-to-belly contact either due to the sports' nature (e.g., wrestling, mixed martial arts) or as a strategy for obtaining rest, breaking-up an opponent's rhythm, heightening camaraderie during play, and/or eliciting post-play celebration (e.g., boxing, beach volleyball).

Cultural background

Western culture
Some assume that alvinolagnia is a cause of the prevalent western fashion of female midriff exposure. 
In the Victorian era, a small waist was considered the main trait of a beautiful woman. The advent of bikinis in 1946, the cheerleading fashion of the 1970s and low-rise fashion started in the early 1990s have contributed to widespread fascination of the belly region. Specific breakthroughs of the belly region being featured in American media include Cher in the 1970s "The Sonny & Cher Comedy Hour," as well as the character Ariel in Disney's The Little Mermaid (1989 film). Midriff exposure also became common in the culture of 20th-century music with many famous female pop stars appearing on and offstage and in music videos with their midriff exposed.
Some get attracted to women wearing a crop top or bikini.

Despite the prevalence of alvinolagnia, midriff exposure, and sexual belly-to-belly contact throughout Western pop culture, it is rare for belly-to-belly contact to be featured in Western media under a non-sexual tone. Nonetheless, non-sexual belly-to-belly contact in Western media generally represents either the establishment of a non-sexual friendship or the strengthening of an existing bond between two people. For example, the North American sitcom Will & Grace features two characters, Jack and Karen, who initiate and periodically bolster their long-lasting friendship via non-sexual belly-to-belly touch, a quirk so infamous that it appeared on the show's holiday special. More recently, non-sexual belly-to-belly touch became a key characteristic of Bayley and Sasha Banks' The Boss n' Hug Connection, a former women's professional wrestling tag team known for engaging in a post-match celebration involving belly-to-belly hugs.

Middle Eastern culture
The eastern art of belly dancing places the female midriff on center stage. The dance movements of the torso are considered to be seductive.

Indian culture

The bare female midriff is considered attractive and erotic in India. Baring the midriff has always been a fashion in Indian women attire. Indian women have traditionally worn saris that bares the midriff, especially South Indian women. The exposure of midriff in a sari is considered to be erotic. The midriff is revealed in other traditional female attires like Ghagra choli. Belly chains known as kamarband in India when worn with low-rise saris and lehengas are considered sensuous. Most Indian women wear belly chains during weddings and other ceremonies as a show of culture and tradition. Nowadays, women have been pairing these chains with western outfits, mostly to draw attention to their figures.

Men are intrigued by the demure floor-length attire and tantalising display of a bare midriff in the back. Indian actress Ileana D'Cruz had commented that there were shots where a big porcelain seashell was thrown on her belly and flowers decorated around her waist during the shoot of her debut film and stated that the belly and navel is supposed to be a mark of a woman's beauty in South Indian films and they believe that the waist line is the most attractive part. Indian Singer Chinmayi once tweeted against a fan's request for sarees during performances, saying, "Groups of men...take photographs of my waist + side of my chest, circle it and upload it on soft porn websites.", "I get messages on how they're masturbating to it."

Some Indian men are aroused by pinching a woman on her midriff bared by the sari. This scenario was depicted in an advertising campaign for a leading constructions company group in India. With the tagline "Everything you love, is in arm's reach", it featured a man at office extending his arm out to pinch his wife's midriff at home, with her expressing joy by smiling and biting her lower lip. It was featured as a full page advertisement in Dec 6, 2013 Chennai issue of the Times of India.

Accessories and tattoos 
Some people wear accessories like belly chains, navel piercings, tattoos etc., to enhance the appearance of the belly. It can be a delicate thin or heavy thick chain.

Managing editor of digital of Canadian magazine Flare Rebecca Perrin stated in an article, "a woman's waist and hips are two of the most physically attractive body parts there are – emphasizing them shouldn't immediately be considered a faux pas and should instead be encouraged." Celebrities like Beyoncé,  Rihanna, Miley Cyrus etc. are known for flaunting their belly chains.

Navel piercing and navel tattoos have become more common among young women. The trend of piercing or tattooing the navel became popular in the 1990s. It is popular among middle-aged women. Some belly chains attach to a navel piercing; they are called "pierced belly chains".
Similar to navel piercings, hip piercings are also popular among women to express a bold personality.

Some get stomach tattoos to attract attention of the onlookers,  but these tattoos are more commonly preferred by women. There are many variations in design, from tribal to flowers. Some women even get these tattoos drawn on their lower backs and flaunt them in low-rise jeans, shorts or skirts.

Sometimes, looser clothing such as scarves or skirts around the female waist and curves can be sexually appealing. Scarves wrapped around the waist are common among belly dancers.

See also
Cultural views on the midriff and navel

References

Sexual fetishism
Paraphilias